Cesare Arbasia (1540s – 1614) was an Italian painter of the Mannerist period.

Born in Saluzzo, Italy, Cesare Arbasia's career began in Saluzzo, and moved throughout Rome and Spain (c. 1579). He also worked in Málaga and Córdoba, conducting his work in a Mannerist style. He trained with Federico Zuccari. In Córdoba, he painted the ceiling of the Most Blessed Sacrament chapel, in the cathedral; while in Savigliano, he painted the ceiling of the church of the Benedictine monks. In Saluzzo, he helped fresco the town hall. In 1601, he was pensioned by the ruler of the House of Savoy in Turin.

References

1540s births
1614 deaths
16th-century Italian painters
Italian male painters
17th-century Italian painters
Italian Mannerist painters
People from Saluzzo